Our Bones is the third EP by American progressive metal band The Contortionist. It was released on August 9, 2019 through eOne Music and Good Fight Entertainment. The EP was self-produced by the band and John Douglass.

Critical reception

The EP received generally positive reviews from critics. Already Heard rated the EP 3.5 out of 5 and: "Overall, Our Bones is a pleasure to listen to. For a short EP and only 15 minutes of music, The Contortionist have managed to create a diverse snapshot that is sure to excite fans of their future." Depth praised the EP saying, "I'm very happy they've allowed us into the world of Our Bones, and I'm keen for whatever lies ahead."

Distorted Sound scored the EP 7 out of 10 and said: "Unlikely to do much more than whet the appetite for a lengthier release, Our Bones is a welcome aperitif, and a lively reminder that The Contortionist are still well worth our attention." Ricky Aarons writing for Metal Injection reviewed the EP stating: "Our Bones feels more like a calculated teaser than a definitive statement, but it looks like we can expect greater intensity and some classic songcraft from The Contortionist in the not-too-distant future."

Track listing

Personnel
The Contortionist
 Michael Lessard – vocals
 Robby Baca – guitars
 Cameron Maynard – guitars
 Jordan Eberhardt – bass
 Joey Baca – drums
 Eric Guenther – keyboards

Additional personnel
 John Douglass – production, engineering
 The Contortionist – production
 Evan Sammons – engineering
 Jamie King – mastering, mixing
 Bobby Bates – photography

References

2019 EPs
The Contortionist albums
E1 Music albums